, which can be loosely translated as "the school of the strategy of two heavens as one", is a koryū (ancient school), transmitting a style of classical Japanese swordsmanship conceived by the warrior Miyamoto Musashi. Hyōhō Niten Ichi-ryū is mainly known for the two-sword—katana and wakizashi—kenjutsu techniques Musashi called Niten Ichi (二天一, "two heavens as one") or Nitō Ichi (二刀一, "two swords as one").

Origin
Musashi originally studied Enmei Ryū and Tōri Ryū, which were ryūha founded by his grandfather Miyamoto Musashi no Kami Yoshimoto and his father Miyamoto Muninosuke respectively. Musashi eventually focused in the kenjutsu and nitōken and developed his own style.

Around 1640, Musashi intended to pass on his art to three successors from among his thousand students; specifically, to Terao Magonojo, his younger brother Kyumanosuke and to Furuhashi Sozaemon. He considered Magonojo to excel in technique but to lack in reflection, while Furuhashi excelled at reflection but lacked technique. Magonojo received the treatise, the Go Rin no Sho. Hosokawa Mitsuhisa made two copies—one for Furuhashi and one for himself, which he transmitted under the name of Ihon go rin no sho. The best known edition today is this Hosokawa copy.

Magonojo then yielded the role of successor to his younger brother Kyumanosuke who had received the Hyoho San-jugo from Musashi. It was Kyumanosuke who transmitted this document to his students with seven added instructions called the Hyoho shiji ni kajo.

Shortly before his death, Musashi also wrote the Dokkodo ("Going My Way"). It seems to be a list of rules that one should try to follow in life steeped in Buddhist precepts.

Succession
Terao Kyumanosuke (Motomenosuke) had received the complete transmission of the School of Musashi, with certification and Musashi's two swords. He at first refused to teach and sent what he had received to Musashi's adopted son, Iori. Iori refused the succession, since the honor had not been bestowed upon him. With this, Kyumanosuke then agreed to take over as head—both his and Iori's actions were manifestations of their respect for Musashi.

Succession in the Hyoho Niten Ichi-ryū (the name given by Musashi towards the end of his life) does not follow a hereditary pattern. It is attested to by the bestowing of two artifacts: a scroll on which is written the name of the techniques and the approach to them that must be transmitted if the school is to be perpetuated truly, and a wooden sword that Musashi made himself, with which he trained and used as a walking stick during the last years of his life, today in possession of the city of Usa's Shinto Shrine.

Dispute
The Gosho-ha Hyōhō Niten Ichi-ryū disputed the lineage claiming that Iwami Toshio Gensho is the sole legal representative of Hyōhō Niten Ichi-ryū until 2007. Miyagawa Yasutaka established a line of Niten Ichi-ryū that continues to practice and thrive in the Kansai region of Japan. Miyagawa Yasutaka and Kiyonaga Tadanao were both students of Aoki Kikuo during the same period. This "Kansai" line, currently under 10th Headmaster Miyagawa Morito, is an alternate but equal lineage to the main line.

Lineage
The lineage to date is as follows:
 Shinmen Miyamoto Musashi-No-Kami Fujiwara no Genshin 新免宮本武蔵守藤原玄信
 Terao Motome-no-suke Nobuyuki 寺尾求馬助信行
 Terao Goemon Katsuyuki 寺尾郷右衛門勝行
 Yoshida Josetsu Masahiro 吉田如雪正広
 Santo Hikozaemon Kyohide 山東彦左衛門清秀
 Santo Hanbe Kiyoaki 山東半兵衛清明
 Santo Shinjuro Kiyotake 山東新十郎清武
 Aoki Kikuo Hisakatsu 青木規矩男久勝
 Kiyonaga Tadanao Masami / Miyagawa Yasutaka
 Imai Masayuki Nobukatsu / Miyagawa Morito (Current)
 Iwami Toshio Gensho/ Kiyonaga Fumiya / Chin Kin (Taiwan)
 Kajiya Takanori (successor of Iwami Toshio Gensho) / Yoshimochi Kiyoshi (successor of Kiyonaga Fumiya)
Yoshomochi Kiyoshi died on 4 January 2020 leaving no successor as stated on his own home page. 後継者の指名はなかった。

Techniques
Today the following sets of techniques and forms are transmitted:

1) Tachi Seiho (太刀勢法) Twelve techniques with long sword:

 指先 Sassen
 八相左 Hasso Hidari
 八相右 Hasso Migi
 受流左 Uke Nagashi Hidari
 受流右 Uke Nagashi Migi
 捩構 Moji Gamae
 張付 Haritsuke
 流打 Nagashi Uchi
 虎振 Tora Buri
 数喜 Kazuki
 合先打留 Aisen Uchidome
 余打 (アマシ打）Amashi Uchi

2) Kodachi Seiho (小太刀勢法) Seven techniques with a short sword:

 指先 Sassen
 中段 Chudan
 受流 Uke Nagashi
 捩構 Moji Gamae
 張付 Haritsuke
 流打 Nagashi Uchi
 合先 Aisen

3) Nito Seiho (二刀勢法) Five techniques with two swords corresponding to the five forms in the Water Scroll:

 中段 Chudan
 上段 Jodan
 下段 Gedan
 左脇構 Hidari Waki Gamae
 右脇構 Migi Waki Gamae

4) Bōjutsu—Twenty techniques with a long staff bō(including techniques Bō Vs Bō and Bō Vs sword).
 
5) Aikuchi roppo, both.

6) Jitte to jutsu—Five techniques against a sword.

References

Further reading
Iwami Toshio Harukatsu soke, 11th successor  in Hyoho Niten Ichi-ryu: 
 "Masters are needles, students are threads", Karate-Bushido February 2011, ed. Européenne de Magazines, original text in French
 "Musashi's principles", Dragon no. 13, January 2006, ed. Mathis; French original text: Les principes de Musashi
 "Musashi's teachings – philosophy first: translation in English", Dragon no. 7, January 2005, ed. Mathis; French original text: L’enseignement de Musashi est d’abord une philosophie

External links

 Hyoho Niten Ichi Ryu in Nihon Kobudo Kyokai
 Hyoho Niten Ichiryu information-portal run by Hyakutake Colin
 Site of Hyoho Niten Ichi Ryu under Yoshimoti Kiyoshi
 Hyoho Niten Ichi Ryu claimed lineage
 Hyoho Niten Ichi Ryu in KoryuWeb
 Miyamoto Musashi; his Swordsmanship and Book of Five Rings

Ko-ryū bujutsu
Japanese martial arts
Japanese swordsmanship
Miyamoto Musashi